Russi is a comune (municipality) in the Province of Ravenna in the Italian region Emilia-Romagna, located about  east of Bologna and about  southwest of Ravenna.

References

External links
 Comune di Russi